Eucheila is a genus of beetles in the family Carabidae, containing the following species:

 Eucheila adisi Ball & Shpeley, 1983 
 Eucheila atrata (Dejean, 1831) 
 Eucheila boliviana (Mateu, 1989) 
 Eucheila boyeri (Solier, 1835) 
 Eucheila breviformis (Chaudoir, 1872) 
 Eucheila cordova Ball & Shpeley, 1983 
 Eucheila costulata (Chaudoir, 1872) 
 Eucheila erwini Shpeley & Ball, 2000 
 Eucheila flavilabris Dejean & Boisduval, 1829 
 Eucheila inpa (Ball & Shpeley, 1983) 
 Eucheila kiplingi Shpeley & Ball, 2000 
 Eucheila lucida (Mateu, 1989) 
 Eucheila marginata Shpeley & Ball, 2000 
 Eucheila mateui Shpeley & Ball, 2000 
 Eucheila megala (Reichardt, 1966) 
 Eucheila mirifica Anichtchenko, 2009 
 Eucheila nevermanni (Liebke, 1929) 
 Eucheila palpalis (Ball & Shpeley, 1983) 
 Eucheila pilosa Shpeley & Ball, 2000 
 Eucheila planipennis (Bates, 1891) 
 Eucheila purpurea (Ball & Shpeley, 1983) 
 Eucheila reichardti (Ball & Shpeley, 1983) 
 Eucheila splendens (Ball & Shpeley, 1983) 
 Eucheila strandi (Liebke, 1939) 
 Eucheila surinamensis Shpeley & Ball, 2000

References

Lebiinae